The 1981 South American Championships was a men's tennis tournament held in Buenos Aires, Argentina. It was the 15th edition of the tournament and was played on outdoor clay courts. The tournament was part of the 1981 Volvo Grand Prix and started was held from 16 November until 22 November 1981. First-seeded Ivan Lendl won the singles title.

Finals

Singles

 Ivan Lendl defeated  Guillermo Vilas 6–1, 6–2
 It was Lendl's 9th title of the year and the 18th of his career.

Doubles
 Marcos Hocevar /  João Soares defeated  Álvaro Fillol /  Jaime Fillol 7–6, 6–7, 6–4
 It was Hocevar's only title of the year and the 1st of his career. It was Soares' only title of the year and the 1st of his career.

References

External links 
 ITF tournament edition details

South American Championships
South American Championships (Tennis), 1981
ATP Buenos Aires
South American Championships
November 1981 sports events in South America